Anthony Paul Dostie (1821–1866) was a dentist and civil rights advocate who was killed in the New Orleans massacre of 1866. A book about his life was published in 1868 as The Life of A.P. Dostie or The Conflict in New Orleans by his daughter Emily Hazen Reed. It is illustrated with an engraving of Dostie by Augustus Robin of New York.

Dostie was born in Saratoga County, New York.

References

American dentists
American civil rights activists
1821 births
1866 deaths
19th-century dentists